is the second studio album by Japanese entertainer Akina Nakamori. It was released on October 27, 1982 by Warner Pioneer under the Reprise Records label. The album includes the controversial single hit "Shōjo A". It became Nakamori's first number-one on the Oricon Weekly Albums Chart and her best sold album.

Background 
Variation (Hensoukyoku) is Nakamori's second studio album, released in 1982, three months after the release of her debut album.

The music production team consisted of main arrangers Mitsuo Hagita and Kei Wakakusa, Kisugi siblings Etsuko and Takao, Masao Urino, Hiroaki Serizawa, Yukinojo Mori and Yoshitaka Minami.

Although the album consists of twelve tracks, "Introduction" and "Ending" are instrumental songs written and arranged by Kei Wakakusa.

Promotion

Single 
The album had one promotional single, "Shōjo A". The single debuted at number 5 on the Oricon Single Weekly Charts and remained on the yearly chart at number 34. In the Best Ten Rankings, the single debuted at number 3 and remained on the 1982 yearly chart at number 13.

Music home video 
On 1 May 1985, Nakamori's third debut anniversary, the second music home video Hajimemashita Nakamori Akina was released. The music video clips were filmed in the United States, mainly in Los Angeles and Santa Monica. Filming began before her debut, between 11 and 17 March 1982. Songs recorded from the original Variation album were "Moroi Gogo", "Maerchen Location", "Bye Bye Lullaby", "Shoujo A", "Sakihokoru Hana Ni" and "Aishū Magic".

Stage performances 
"Shoujo A" has been performed very often in the Yoru no Hit Studio, The Best Ten and various live tours.

Most of the songs were performed in the live tour Milky Way in 1983, including "Cancel", "Moroi Gogo", "Aishū Magic" , "Bye Bye Lullaby", "Catastrophe no Amagasa", "Maerchen Location" and "Sakihokoru Hana Ni".

"Yokohama Akuma" and "Dai Nanakan (Septieme Sens)" were performed in the live tour Rainbow Shower in 1983.

"Catastrophe no Amagasa" was performed again in the acoustic live Akina Nakamori: 21 Seiki he no Tabidachi in 2000.

Chart performance 
The album reached number one on the Oricon Album Weekly Chart for three consecutive weeks, charted 34 weeks and sold over 742,900 copies. It is Nakamori's best sold album. The album was ranked at number 8 on the Oricon Album Yearly Chart in 1983.

Track listing

References

External links 
 
 
 

1982 albums
Akina Nakamori albums
Warner Music Japan albums
Japanese-language albums